Dilobocondyla is a genus of ants in the subfamily Myrmicinae. The genus is distributed in the Oriental and Australasian realms. It seems to be rare, with most species known only from single specimens.

Species

Dilobocondyla bangalorica Varghese, 2006
Dilobocondyla borneensis Wheeler, 1916
Dilobocondyla carinata Zettel & Bruckner, 2013
Dilobocondyla cataulacoidea (Stitz, 1911)
Dilobocondyla chapmani Wheeler, 1924
Dilobocondyla didita (Walker, 1859)
Dilobocondyla eguchii Bharti & Kumar, 2013
Dilobocondyla fouqueti Santschi, 1910
Dilobocondyla fulva Viehmeyer, 1916
Dilobocondyla gaoyureni Bharti & Kumar, 2013
Dilobocondyla gasteroreticulatus Bharti & Kumar, 2013
Dilobocondyla karnyi Wheeler, 1924
Dilobocondyla oswini Zettel & Bruckner, 2013
Dilobocondyla propotriangulatus Bharti & Kumar, 2013
Dilobocondyla rugosa Zettel & Bruckner, 2013
Dilobocondyla sebesiana Wheeler, 1924
Dilobocondyla selebensis (Emery, 1898)
Dilobocondyla silviae Zettel & Bruckner, 2013
Dilobocondyla yamanei Bharti & Kumar, 2013

References

External links

Myrmicinae
Ant genera
Taxa named by Felix Santschi